Rowing at the 1956 Summer Olympics featured seven events, for men only. The competitions were held from 23 to 27 November on Lake Wendouree, Ballarat, Australia.

Medal summary

Participating nations

A total of 242 rowers from 25 nations competed at the Melbourne Games:

Medal table

References

External links
 International Olympic Committee medal database

 
1956 Summer Olympics events
1956
Oly